Partner and localizer of BRCA2, also known as PALB2 or FANCN, is a protein which in humans is encoded by the PALB2 gene.

Function 

This gene encodes a protein that functions in genome maintenance (double strand break repair). This protein binds to and colocalizes with the breast cancer 2 early onset protein (BRCA2) in nuclear foci and likely permits the stable intranuclear localization and accumulation of BRCA2. PALB2 binds the single strand DNA and directly interacts with the recombinase RAD51 to stimulate strand invasion, a vital step of homologous recombination, PALB2 can function synergistically with a BRCA2 chimera (termed piccolo, or piBRCA2) to further promote strand invasion.

Clinical significance 

Variants in the PALB2 gene are associated with an increased risk of developing breast cancer  of magnitude similar to that associated with BRCA2 mutations  and PALB2-deficient cells are sensitive to PARP inhibitors.

PALB2 was recently identified as a susceptibility gene for familial pancreatic cancer by scientists at the Sol Goldman Pancreatic Cancer Research Center at Johns Hopkins.  This has paved for the way for developing a new gene test for families where pancreatic cancer occurs in multiple family members. Tests for PALB2 have been developed by Ambry Genetics  and Myriad Genetics that are now available. 

Prophylactic mastectomy should be considered for women that had breast cancer and a PALB2 mutation.

Biallelic mutations in PALB2 (also known as FANCN), similar to biallelic BRCA2 mutations, cause Fanconi anemia.

Mutations in this gene have been associated with an increased risk of ovarian, breast and pancreatic cancer.

Meiosis

PALB2 mutant male mice have reduced fertility.  This reduced fertility appears to be due to germ cell attrition resulting from a combination of unrepaired DNA breaks during meiosis and defective synapsis of the X and Y chromosomes.  The function of homologous recombination during meiosis appears to be repair of DNA damages, particularly double-strand breaks (also see Origin and function of meiosis).  The PALB2-BRCA1 interaction is likely important for repairing such damages during male meiosis.

See also 
 Fanconi anemia
 BRCA2
 DNA repair
 Tumor suppressor gene

References

Further reading

External links 
 
PALB2 Interest Group – research consortium
Human proteins